Allora is a genus of skipper butterflies (family Hesperiidae).

Species
 Allora doleschallii Felder, 1860
 Allora major (Rothschild, 1915)

External links

Genus info

Coeliadinae
Hesperiidae genera